The import of goods into the Gaza Strip is restricted because of the blockade of the Gaza Strip by Israel and Egypt. Israel allows limited humanitarian supplies from aid organizations, including UN agencies, into the Gaza Strip. As of May 2010, they have brought in, according to the Coordinator of Government Activities in the Territories of the Israel Defense Forces, 1.5 million liters of diesel fuel and gasoline, fruits and vegetables, wheat, sugar, meat, chicken and fish products, dairy products, animal feed, hygiene products, clothing and shoes.

Cement, wood, iron, cattle, animal medicine, musical instruments, and notebooks were among the items banned before June 2010.

Background
After Hamas won the 2006 election for the Palestinian Legislative Council, Israel and Egypt tightened the closure of Gaza's borders. Israel says the reason for the restrictions on import of goods into the Gaza Strip is to pressure Hamas, which does not recognise Israel and backs attacks on its citizens. Construction materials including metal pipes, steel and cement are banned, because they can be used for building rockets and in constructing underground bunkers and tunnels.

In September 2007, after an intensification of Qassam rocket attacks, Israel declared Gaza "hostile territory," and Israel stopped the supply of electricity, fuel, and other supplies into Gaza. The objective of the blockade was to pressure Hamas into stopping the rocket attacks and to deprive them of the supplies necessary for the continuation of rocket attacks. It argued that following the takeover of Gaza by Hamas and the intensification of Qassam rocket attacks, it is not legally responsible for Gaza and not obliged to help a hostile territory beyond whatever is necessary to avoid a humanitarian crisis. Egypt also closed the Rafah Border Crossing in June 2007, maintaining that it cannot fully open the Rafah crossing since completely opening the border would represent Egyptian recognition of the Hamas control of Gaza, undermine the legitimacy of the Palestinian National Authority and consecrate the split between Gaza and the West Bank.

Imports through Egypt
The Rafah Border Crossing is the sole crossing point between Egypt and the Gaza Strip. It has been closed for the transfer of commercial goods since 2007, and Egypt maintained that it would only open the crossing if forces from the Palestinian Authority presidential guard and a European supervisory force returned to guard the border crossing. 

On 1 June 2010 the border was partially opened, and the Egyptian Red Crescent sent 30 tons of medicine across the border on 14 June. Egypt’s foreign ministry has made it clear that the crossing will remain open mainly for people, not for aid, to pass. The Arab Physicians Union officials submitted a request to Egyptian authorities on 3 June 2010 to send 400 tons of food, blankets, electric generators for hospitals and construction material from Egypt to Gaza, but the request was denied by Egyptian authorities without specific reason. Emad Gad, political analyst at Egyptian Al-Ahram Center for Political and Strategic Studies, believes the government should keep the Rafah border under control because opening it completely could allow weapons smuggling or illegal financial transactions.

Egypt does not limit the supply of gas and fuel, though since Egyptian fuel is heavier than Israeli fuel, it damages the newer cars in Gaza and causes malfunctions.

Imports through Israel

List of items
Israel's blockade was initially more restrictive and has generally been softened over time.

Post-June 2010
On June 17, 2010, Israel agreed to ease restrictions on items permitted into the Gaza strip.

List no. 1: Items Subject to Specific Permission

1. Arms and Munitions: forbidden transfer under all circumstances across Israel's frontiers without specific permits - as defined in the Control of Exports Security Order (Arms and Munitions) 5768-2008, and in the Control of Exports Security Order (Missile Equipment) 5768-2008.

2. Dual Use goods and items: liable to be used, side by side with their civilian purposes, for the development, production, installation or enhancement of military capabilities and terrorist capacities. This list comprises:

Items listed under the Wassenaar Arrangement: As specified in the updated (2008) "Wassenaar Arrangement on Export Controls for Arms and Dual Use Goods and Technologies - List of Dual Use Goods and Technologies and Munitions List."

Items whose entry into the PA Areas is controlled based on Israeli legislation: i.e. materials and equipment liable to be used for terror attacks and technology that could be used by terrorists - as defined in the Control of Exports Security Order (Controlled Dual Use Equipment Transferred to the PA Areas) 5768-2008 and in Orders of the OC Central Command.

These lists include, in detail, a range of chemicals used in the production of explosives (including certain fertilizers); specific types of metal profiles; ball bearings; lathes and their parts; composite materials; hunting knives and machetes; optical equipment, such as lasers and night vision goggles; certain navigation aides; diving equipment; parachutes, gliders and other nonmotorized airborne vehicles; flares and fireworks; avionics and flight control equipment; missile related computer technologies; rock drills and equipment drawing water from excavated sites.
Items not necessarily included in the lists above but whose entry into Gaza is controlled, as detailed below:

i. Items and chemicals which could be used in the production of high trajectory weapons (rockets and mortars) by Hamas and other terror groups in Gaza - Fertilizers or other mixtures - specifically containing KCl at more than 5%; Epoxy and Vinyl Ester resins; Hardeners for Epoxy Resins containing Amides or Amines; Accelerators for Vinyl Esters; HTPB; Water purification solutions at concentrations higher than 11%.

ii. Items used as raw materials for improving protection for terror activists
- Fibers or woven fabrics containing Carbon or Glass variants.

iii. Vessels.

List No. 2: Construction Items and Materials to be Allowed Entry into Gaza only for PA-authorized Projects Implemented by the International Community

Israel will only permit their entry into Gaza to facilitate construction projects in Gaza which have been authorized by the PA and implemented and monitored by the international community. The often cited reason is that such materials could be  used by  Hamas for military purposes (building bunkers, fortifying positions and digging tunnels)

This list includes:

 Portland cement and lime (in bulk, bags or barrels)
 Natural and Quarry aggregates and all varieties of gravel
 Ready concrete
 Precast concrete elements and products
 Steel elements and/or construction products
 Iron for foundations and columns, at any diameter (including wielded steel nets)
 Steel cables of any width
 Forms for construction elements (plastics or galvanized iron)
 Industrialized forms for casting concrete
 Plastic or composite beams more than 4 mm thick
 Thermal isolation materials and products
 Blocs (at any width) - Concrete; Silicate; Ytong or its equivalent; or gypsum
 Materials and products for sealing structures
 Asphalt and its components (Bitumen, emulsion) in aggregate or packaged
 Steel elements or framing products for construction
 Cast concrete elements and products for drainage over 1 m in diameter
 Precast units and sea-borne containers
 Vehicles, excluding private cars and including 4X4 vehicles and other categories of motor vehicles liable to be used in terror activities
 Lumber beams and boards more than 2 cm thick, (liable to be used in "offensive" tunneling aimed at penetrating Israeli territory), unless incorporated in finished products
 Specific procedures, on a case by case basis, will be established so as to permit the transfer of such lumber for other purposes in Gaza.

Pre-June 2010
According to Amnesty International, the Economist, Haaretz and UN reports, prior to June 2010, the following were banned or restricted:

Food. According to a UN report, importation of lentils, pasta, tomato paste and juice has been restricted. Pasta has since been allowed. Sugar has always been allowed. Soda, juice, jam, spices, shaving cream, potato chips, cookies and candy are now permitted. Fruit, milk products in small packages and frozen food products are also allowed. Dry food, ginger and chocolate were at one point barred.

Household items. A4 paper, crayons, stationery, soccer balls, and musical instruments have been, at times, banned for import. AFP includes toilet paper as a banned good, though the BBC lists it as permitted. According to the Haaretz the following items were banned in 2009: books, candles, crayons, clothing, cups, cutlery, crockery, electric appliances such as refrigerators and washing machines, glasses, light bulbs, matches, musical instruments, needles, sheets, blankets, shoes, mattresses, spare machine and car parts, and thread.  

Reconstruction materials. Amnesty International and other organisations report that cement, glass, steel, bitumen, wood, paint, doors, plastic pipes, metal pipes, metal reinforcement rods, aggregate, generators, high voltage cables and wooden telegraph poles are high priority reconstruction materials currently with no or highly limited entry into Gaza through official crossings. A UN report by Kevin M. Cahill said reconstruction was halted because of lack of steel, cement or glass, among other building materials.

Fuel. Fuel had not been imported from Israel since 2008. While fuel is available from Egypt, in contrast to Israeli fuel, it damages the newer cars in Gaza and causes malfunctions. Israel allowed only limited amounts of industrial fuel into Gaza prior to June 2010.

Agriculture and fishing. According to Gisha, fishing ropes and rods, ginger and chocolate, hatcheries and spare parts for hatcheries, were at one point barred.

Medical material. Batteries for hearing aids have been restricted. Wheelchairs, at various times, have been banned.

According to the Haaretz, the number of items allowed into Gaza, as of May 2010, is about 100. Before the blockade, some 4,000 items were allowed. Gisha states that a large Israeli supermarket holds 10,000-15,000 items.

Information about the blockade
A list of items which Israel allowed for commercial import has been compiled by the BBC from information from international groups including Israeli Human Rights Organisation Gisha. Humanitarian organisations, including UN agencies, which also bring goods into Gaza have their items approved or rejected on "a case-by-case basis". The items allowed are always changing, and commercial and humanitarian importers, according to BBC, "are constantly attempting to guess what will be approved."

Gisha have said that their list is approximate, partial and it changes from time to time because Israeli authorities refuse to disclose information regarding the restrictions on transferring goods into Gaza. Gisha acquires information from Palestinian traders, international organizations, and the Palestinian Coordination Committee, "all of whom "deduce" what is permitted and what is banned based on their experience requesting permission to bring goods into Gaza and the answers they receive from the Israeli authorities". 

In January 2010, the Israeli human rights group Gisha took Israeli authorities to court, it attempt to force them to reveal which goods were permitted and which goods weren't. The Israeli State denied it has "a list of permitted goods" for months. However, in its updated response to a petition  submitted by Gisha under the Freedom of Information Act, the State recently admitted that it does have a list of permitted goods and other documents relating to the transfer of goods to Gaza, but claimed that revealing them would harm state security and/or Israel's foreign relations. A hearing to determine whether the documents should be revealed will be held in October 2010." Gisha reported that since Israel tightened the blockade on Gaza an average of 2,300 trucks entered the strip every month, about a quarter of the number of trucks before 2007.

Rationale
Israel says that the importation curbs are in place to pressure Hamas.

An Israeli government document obtained in response to the lawsuit describes Israel's blockade as "economic warfare": "A country has the right to decide that it chooses not to engage in economic relations or to give economic assistance to the other party to the conflict, or that it wishes to operate using 'economic warfare'. "An Israeli government spokesman in June 2010 added that the blockade is intended to bring about a political goal and that Israel "could not lift the embargo altogether as long as Hamas remains in control" of Gaza.

In the past Israel expressed concerns about Hamas using building materials for military means.

Reactions
In February 2009, then American Senator John Kerry (D-MA) visited Gaza and expressed his "astonishment" at the ban of items. Importation of pasta was allowed after that.

See also
 Gaza–Israel conflict
 Gaza flotilla raid

References

External links
Gaza Under Blockade BBC
Details of Gaza blockade revealed in court case BBC
BBC Confidential Research Recently Permitted Import Items List 05.05.2010
Gisha Palestinian Parties-International Organisations' Real life Experiences on Banned/Allowed Import Items List 06.06.2010
Israel State Response on Banned Item Regulations 25.04.2010

Gaza–Israel conflict
Human rights in the Gaza Strip
Economy of the Gaza Strip
Israel–Gaza Strip border
Blockades
2000s in the Gaza Strip
2010s in the Gaza Strip